Swami Kirtidananda (1925-2007) was born as Srikantayya in an orthodox family at Bangalore on 25 June 1925. He had his education at National High School and graduated from Central College. He later joined the Ramakrishna Math in 1946 at its Bangalore Centre under Tyagishananda. He had mantra deeksha from Virajananda, the 6th President of the Ramakrishna Sangha and had sannyasa deeksha from Shankarananda in 1957.

Locations he served
Ramakrishna Mission/Math centres in Colombo
Advaita Ashrama at Kolkota
Advaita Ashrama at Mayavati
Ramakrishna Mission Hostel, T. Nagar in Chennai
B. T. College Hostel, Saradapith
Ramakrishna Math, Kalimpong
Head of Ramakrishna Mission, Along Centre in Arunachal Pradesh
Ramakrishna Mission Students’ Home, Chennai
Ramakrishna Math, Chandigarh

Career
He was the Joint-Editor of Prabuddha Bharata during 1964-66. 

He was a monk of deep scriptural knowledge, a thinker and writer, conversationalist and an organizer. He was orthodox by nature. His article "Half a decade in the Enchanting Environs of Along" in Prabuddha Bharata Jan-June 2003 issues and "Descent of the Divine at Lohaghat" in 1999 Mayavati Centenary issue of Prabuddha Bharata are appreciated besides his articles expressing his personality.

Death
He died on 10 June 2007 at Ramakrishna Math, Ulsoor in Bangalore, where he was leading his retired life.

References

Monks of the Ramakrishna Mission
1925 births
2007 deaths